Chincholi Wildlife Sanctuary is located in the Kalaburagi district of Karnataka. It is a dry land Wildlife Sanctuary in South India. It has dry deciduous forest with major plantations of Acacia and teak plantations. It is home to different varieties of flora and fauna, including sandalwood, red sanders, blackbuck, striped hyena, wolf, and fruit bats.

Location 
Chincholi Wildlife Sanctuary spans over an area of 134.88 sq. km. It is situated in the Kalaburagi district of Karnataka in India. It is the first dry land Wildlife Sanctuary which is rich in floristic diversity in the Hyderabad-Karnataka region.

Flora and fauna 
The sanctuary has medicinal herbs and trees in its compound. It also has Acacia and teak plantations. Chincholi Wildlife Sanctuary has over 35 species of birds, such as blue pigeon, black-winged kite, blossom-headed parakeet, black drongo and many more.

References 

Wildlife sanctuaries in Karnataka
Geography of Kalaburagi district
Year of establishment missing